Jack Zephania Tocho (born November 2, 1995) is an American football safety who is currently a free agent. He played college football at North Carolina State University, and was drafted by the Minnesota Vikings in the seventh round of the 2017 NFL Draft.

Early years
Born in Gastonia, North Carolina, Tocho started playing football at age eight. He attended Independence High School, where he played cornerback, running back and safety for coach Bill Geiler. Tocho started at linebacker on varsity during his sophomore season because of a void at the position. In 2011, Tocho was moved back to cornerback for his junior year where he earned All-Southwestern Conference honors after ending the campaign with five interceptions, 28 pass breakups, 48 tackles, a forced fumble, a blocked kick, and two touchdowns on kickoff returns. During the summer, Tocho was timed at 4.49 in the 40-yard dash and recorded a 35.5-inch vertical jump at the Under Armour Combine, after checking in at 6'0" and 175 pounds. As a senior, he was named Independence's 2012 Scholar Athlete of the Year and was named to the Associated Press All-State team after helping lead his team to a 10-3 record and second round of the state playoffs. He totalled 57 tackles (49 of them solo), six interceptions and returned three kicks for touchdowns in his final season. Tocho also participated in track and field for the Patriots.

Despite his combine numbers and on-field accomplishments, Tocho was an under the radar prospect and only NC State and Virginia expressed interest in him. After taking a visit to NC State, he committed to play college football for the Wolfpack on January 18, 2013.

Professional career
Tocho ran a 4.54-second 40-yard dash at the 2017 NFL Combine.

Minnesota Vikings
Tocho was selected in the seventh round (245th overall) by the Minnesota Vikings in the 2017 NFL Draft. Tocho is the fifth player in Vikings history to be drafted from North Carolina State, joining running back Ted Brown, cornerback Dewayne Washington, safety Brian Williams and linebacker Audie Cole. Tocho was the only player in the defensive back position group taken by the Vikings in the 2017 draft. On September 2, 2017, Tocho was waived by the Vikings. He was signed to their practice squad on September 20, 2017. He was released on November 1, 2017, and was re-signed on November 14. He was released again on December 12, 2017, but was re-signed three days later. He signed a reserve/future contract with the Vikings on January 29, 2018.

On September 1, 2018, Tocho was waived by the Vikings and was signed to the practice squad the next day. He was released on September 19, 2018.

Washington Redskins
On December 19, 2018, Tocho was signed to the Washington Redskins practice squad.

Birmingham Iron
In 2019, Tocho joined the Birmingham Iron of the Alliance of American Football.

Pittsburgh Steelers
Tocho was signed by the Pittsburgh Steelers on April 5, 2019, three days after the AAF suspended football operations. He was released on May 9, 2019.

Los Angeles Wildcats
In October 2019, Tocho was selected by the Los Angeles Wildcats in the 2020 XFL Draft. He had his contract terminated when the league suspended operations on April 10, 2020.

Personal life
Tocho's parents, David and Gertrude, immigrated to the United States from Kenya in pursuit of a better life. His middle name, Zephania, comes from his paternal grandfather. Tocho was a two-time Academic All-ACC performer, qualifying for the honor by maintaining a 3.0 cumulative grade point average during his undergraduate academic career. He earned his undergraduate degree in finance with a minor in accounting in just three years.

References

External links
NC State Wolfpack bio

1995 births
Living people
American football cornerbacks
American football safeties
Birmingham Iron players
Los Angeles Wildcats (XFL) players
Minnesota Vikings players
NC State Wolfpack football players
Players of American football from Charlotte, North Carolina
Pittsburgh Steelers players
Washington Redskins players
Philadelphia Stars (2022) players